Psalm 33 is the 33rd psalm of the Book of Psalms, beginning in English in the King James Version: "Rejoice in the LORD, O ye righteous: for praise is comely for the upright". The Book of Psalms is part of the third section of the Hebrew Bible, and a book of the Christian Old Testament. In the slightly different numbering system used in the Greek Septuagint and Latin Vulgate translations of the Bible, this psalm is Psalm 32. In Latin, it is known by the incipit, "". Its purpose is to praise "the Sovereignty of the Lord in Creation and History".
 
Psalm 33 is used in both Jewish and Christian liturgies. It has been set to music.

Text

Hebrew Bible version 
The following is the Hebrew text of Psalm 33:

King James Version 
 Rejoice in the LORD, O ye righteous: for praise is comely for the upright.
 Praise the LORD with harp: sing unto him with the psaltery and an instrument of ten strings.
 Sing unto him a new song; play skilfully with a loud noise.
 For the word of the LORD is right; and all his works are done in truth.
 He loveth righteousness and judgment: the earth is full of the goodness of the LORD.
 By the word of the LORD were the heavens made; and all the host of them by the breath of his mouth.
 He gathereth the waters of the sea together as an heap: he layeth up the depth in storehouses.
 Let all the earth fear the LORD: let all the inhabitants of the world stand in awe of him.
 For he spake, and it was done; he commanded, and it stood fast.
 The LORD bringeth the counsel of the heathen to nought: he maketh the devices of the people of none effect.
 The counsel of the LORD standeth for ever, the thoughts of his heart to all generations.
 Blessed is the nation whose God is the LORD; and the people whom he hath chosen for his own inheritance.
 The LORD looketh from heaven; he beholdeth all the sons of men.
 From the place of his habitation he looketh upon all the inhabitants of the earth.
 He fashioneth their hearts alike; he considereth all their works.
 There is no king saved by the multitude of an host: a mighty man is not delivered by much strength.
 An horse is a vain thing for safety: neither shall he deliver any by his great strength.
 Behold, the eye of the LORD is upon them that fear him, upon them that hope in his mercy;
 To deliver their soul from death, and to keep them alive in famine.
 Our soul waiteth for the LORD: he is our help and our shield.
 For our heart shall rejoice in him, because we have trusted in his holy name.
 Let thy mercy, O LORD, be upon us, according as we hope in thee.

Verse 7 
He gathers the waters of the sea together as a heap;
He lays up the deep in storehouses.
Alternatively, "as a heap" may be read as "in a vessel", or "in a wineskin".

Content
In the International Critical Commentary series, Charles and Emilie Briggs described it as follows: "Ps. 33 is a song of praise. (1) A call to worship in the temple with song, music, and shouting (v.1–3), because of the righteousness and kindness of Yahweh (v.4–5). (2) All mankind are called to fear Yahweh, the creator of all things, and disposer of all nations (v.6–10). (3) Yahweh from His heavenly throne inspects all mankind (v.13–15); and victory is not due to armies or warriors (v.16–17). (4) He delivereth those who fear Him (v.18–19); therefore his people long for Him, are glad in him, and trust in His name for victory (v.20–22). A gloss praises the plans of Yahweh as everlastingly secure, and also the happiness of His people (v.11–12)."

Psalm 33 does not contain an ascription to any particular author in the Hebrew text, although the Septuagint ascribes it to David. Some manuscripts join it with Psalm 32. The Briggses suggest that it dates to the time of the Maccabees.

Uses

Judaism
Is recited in its entirety during the Pesukei Dezimra on Shabbat, Yom Tov, and - in many communities - on Hoshana Rabbah.
Is recited by some during Tashlikh.
Is recited on days of Fast of Behav in some traditions.
Verse 1 is part of Shochein Ad.
Verse 10 is the tenth verse of Yehi Kivod in Pesukei Dezimra. Verse 11 is the twelfth verse of Yehi Kivod. Verse 9 is the thirteenth verse of Yehi Kivod.
Verse 15 is found in Tractate Rosh Hashanah 1:2.
Verses 20–22 are the second thru fourth verses of Hoshia Et Amecha of Pesukei Dezimra.
Verse 22 is part of the final paragraph of Tachanun and Baruch Hashem L'Olam during Maariv.

New Testament
Verse 6, "By the word of the Lord the heavens were made", is alluded to in Hebrews 11:3: "By faith we know the universe was made by God's command".

Book of Common Prayer
In the Church of England's Book of Common Prayer, this psalm is appointed to be read on the evening of the sixth day of the month.

Musical settings 
Heinrich Schütz wrote a setting of a paraphrase of the psalm in German, "Freut euch des Herrn, ihr Christen all", SWV 130, for the Becker Psalter, published first in 1628. Carl Loewe composed a setting in German for male a cappella choir, published in Dresden in 1845. Alan Hovhaness set portions of this psalm, along with Psalms 146 and 150, in his opus 222 Praise the Lord with Psaltery.

References

Bibliography

Nosson Scherman (1984), The Complete Artscroll Siddur, Mesorah Publications, .

External links

 
 
  in Hebrew and English - Mechon-mamre
 Text of Psalm 33 according to the 1928 Psalter
 Rejoice, you righteous, in the LORD; praise from the upright is fitting. text and footnotes, usccb.org United States Conference of Catholic Bishops
 Psalm 33:1 introduction and text, biblestudytools.com
 Psalm 33 – The Great and Awesome God enduringword.com
 Psalm 33 / Refrain: The earth is full of the loving-kindness of the Lord. Church of England
 Psalm 33 at biblegateway.com
 Hymns for Psalm 33 hymnary.org

033
Shacharit for Shabbat and Yom Tov